E Jun Qi was the lord of the state of E during the Warring States period. He was the son of the King Huai of Chu. 

E Jun Qi is mostly known due to the uniquely shaped tallies addressed to him by the king. The tallies were discovered in Shou County, Anhui Province, in April 1957.

Literature 
 Falkenhausen, Lothar von. “The E Jun Qi Metal Tallies: Inscribed Texts and Ritual Contexts.” In Text and Ritual in Early China, ed. Martin Kern, 79–123. Seattle: University of Washington Press, 2005.

4th-century BC Chinese people
Archaeology of China